Ambutonium bromide is a muscarinic antagonist.

References

Muscarinic antagonists
Quaternary ammonium compounds